The International Thomas Merton Society, founded in 1987, is a learned society which studies the works of American Catholic writer and mystic Thomas Merton. It sponsors conferences and co-publishes a journal, The Merton Seasonal. The society and the Thomas Merton Center are located at Bellarmine University in Louisville, Kentucky, U.S.A.

References
CBC Radio, Ideas: Heretic Blood: The Spiritual Geography of Thomas Merton Radio documentary mentions that some interviews about Merton were recorded at a meeting of the International Thomas Merton Society.
 Catholic News Service, January 7, 2005 - "Thomas Merton scholars upset by monk's absence in upcoming catechism" By Carol Zimmermann

External links
International Thomas Merton Society Official site.

Organizations established in 1987
Bellarmine University
Learned societies of the United States
Clubs and societies in the United States